The Sulu pygmy woodpecker (Yungipicus ramsayi), also known as the Sulu woodpecker, is a species of bird in the family Picidae. Formerly lumped with the Philippine pygmy woodpecker (Y. maculatus), it seems to form a superspecies with this and the Sulawesi pygmy woodpecker (Y. temminckii). Some taxonomic authorities continue to place this species in the genus Dendrocopos or Picoides.

It is endemic to the Philippines. Its natural habitats are tropical moist lowland forest, tropical mangrove forest, and arable land. It is threatened by habitat loss.

Description 
EBird describes the bird as "A small woodpecker of lowland wooded areas on the Sulu Islands. Dark brown above with some white spots on the back, a white rump, throat, and underparts with faint streaking, and buffy sides of the chest. Note the alternating dark brown and white stripes on the head, with a dark forecrown. Hind crown is dark in females and bright red in males. Unmistakable. No other similarly sized woodpeckers occur in its range. Voice includes a series of rapid notes in a forceful trill."

Habitat and Conservation Status 
It inhabits forest clearings, forest edge, mangroves and cultivated areas, in addition to primary forest, although it has been speculated that it avoids dense forest. It is seen in altitudes up to 550 meters above sea level. However, its habitat preferences are poorly understood. Its tolerance of degraded habitats implies that it should be more numerous than is the case.

The IUCN Red List classifies this bird as a vulnerable with population estimates of 2,500 to 9,999 mature individuals.  Although this species is supposedly more tolerant of habitat degradation, it is still threatened by habitat loss with wholesale clearance of forest habitats as a result of legal and illegal logging, mining, conversion into farmlands or palm oil plantations and urbanization. Due to the rapid loss of habitat in the Sulu Archipelago, many of the birds endemic to the region like the Sulu hornbill, Tawitawi brown dove, Blue-winged racket-tail, Sulu hawk-owl are all threatened with extinction.

There are no species specific conservation programs going on at the moment but conservation actions proposed include more species surveys to better understand habitat and population.  Lobby for protection of remaining forest. Continue to expand environmental awareness programs and raise the species profile and instill pride in locals

References

Sulu pygmy woodpecker
Fauna of Sulu
Fauna of Tawi-Tawi
Fauna of Basilan
Endemic birds of the Philippines
Sulu pygmy woodpecker
Taxonomy articles created by Polbot
Taxobox binomials not recognized by IUCN